The Beginning is the 28th album by Jandek. It was released in 1999, and was given Corwood Industries release number 0766. It is considered the final album of Jandek's "second acoustic phase".

Track listing

Reviews

External links
Seth Tisue's The Beginning review

Jandek albums
Corwood Industries albums
1999 albums